Yūjirō, Yujiro or Yuujirou is a masculine Japanese given name.

Possible writings
Yūjirō can be written using different combinations of kanji characters. Some examples: 

勇二郎, "courage, 2, son"
勇次郎, "courage, next, son"
勇治郎, "courage, to manage, son"
雄二郎, "masculine, 2, son"
雄次郎, "masculine, next, son"
雄治郎, "masculine, to manage, son"
裕二郎, "abundant, 2, son"
裕次郎, "abundant, next, son"
佑二郎, "to help, 2, son"
佑次郎, "to help, next, son"

The name can also be written in hiragana ゆうじろう or katakana ユウジロウ.

Notable people with the name
, Japanese agricultural economist
, Japanese actor and singer
, Japanese psychologist
, Japanese professional wrestler
, Japanese sumo wrestler
, Japanese professional wrestler

Fictional characters
Yujiro Hanma (範馬 勇次郎) from manga and anime Baki the Grappler.

Japanese masculine given names